Aaron Kenneth Myette (born September 26, 1977) is a Canadian former professional baseball right-handed pitcher, who played in Major League Baseball (MLB) and Nippon Professional Baseball (NPB).

Career
Myette attended the University of Washington, where he played college baseball for the Washington Huskies in 1996.

Myette was selected by the Seattle Mariners in the 17th round of the 1995 Major League Baseball draft (454th overall), and then by the Chicago White Sox in the first round of the 1997 Major League Baseball draft (43rd overall). He played for the White Sox in 1999 and 2000. The White Sox traded Myette and Brian Schmack to the Texas Rangers for Royce Clayton after the 2000 season. He played for the Rangers (2001–2002), Cleveland Indians (2003) and Cincinnati Reds (2004). He was a member of Team Canada at the 2004 Summer Olympics, where they finished in fourth place. In 2005, he played for Tohoku Rakuten Golden Eagles in Japan. Myette played for the York Revolution of the independent Atlantic League for the 2008 season.

Aaron's brother Andrew was drafted in three consecutive years by the Rangers: the 17th round of the 2000 draft (514th overall), the 44th round of the 2001 draft (1305th overall) and the 41st round of the 2002 draft (1222nd overall).

Myette's first major league strikeout victim was Mo Vaughn.

References

External links

 
 
 

1977 births
Living people
Akron Aeros players
Baseball people from British Columbia
Baseball players at the 1999 Pan American Games
Baseball players at the 2004 Summer Olympics
Birmingham Barons players
Buffalo Bisons (minor league) players
Central Arizona Vaqueros baseball players
Charlotte Knights players
Chicago White Sox players
Cincinnati Reds players
Cleveland Indians players
Canadian expatriate baseball players in Japan
Canadian expatriate baseball players in the United States
Hickory Crawdads players
Louisville Bats players
Major League Baseball pitchers
Major League Baseball players from Canada
Nippon Professional Baseball pitchers
Oklahoma RedHawks players
Olympic baseball players of Canada
Pan American Games bronze medalists for Canada
Pan American Games medalists in baseball
Scranton/Wilkes-Barre Red Barons players
Sportspeople from New Westminster
Texas Rangers players
Tohoku Rakuten Golden Eagles players
Tulsa Drillers players
Washington Huskies baseball players
World Baseball Classic players of Canada
York Revolution players
2006 World Baseball Classic players
Medalists at the 1999 Pan American Games